Muschampia poggei   is a  butterfly found in the  East Palearctic  (Asia Minor, Mesopotamia to Middle East, Transcaucasia) that belongs to the skipper family.

Description from Seitz

H. poggei Led. (85 c). Costal fold of male very feebly developed, represented by a ridge on the costa. Hindwing beneath without white spot in the centre of interspace 7. Syria, Armenia.

Biology
The larva feeds on Phlomis.

References

External links
 Butterfly Conservation Armenia

Muschampia